The 1943 VFL season was the 47th season of the Victorian Football League (VFL), the highest level senior Australian rules football competition in Victoria.

As in 1942, only eleven of the league's twelve clubs competed, with  remaining in recess due to travel restrictions during World War II. The season ran from 8 May until 25 September, and comprised a 15-game home-and-away season followed by a finals series featuring the top four clubs.

The premiership was won by the Richmond Football Club for the fifth time, after it defeated  by five points in the 1943 VFL Grand Final.

Premiership season
In 1942, the VFL competition consisted of eleven teams of 18 on-the-field players each (Geelong did not field a team due to wartime rail and road transport restrictions), plus one substitute player, known as the 19th man. A player could be substituted for any reason; however, once substituted, a player could not return to the field of play under any circumstances.

Teams played each other in a home-and-away season of 16 rounds. During the first 11 rounds each team played each other once and had one bye. At round 11, the eleventh team on the ladder dropped out of the competition. In the remaining rounds (12 to 16), the other ten teams played 5 matches each. This more even fixture was seen as an improvement on 1942's season, in which teams played an unequal number of matches (14 or 15).

During the 1943 season, the Melbourne Cricket Ground, the Lake Oval, and the Junction Oval were all appropriated for military use. Melbourne shared the Punt Road Oval with Richmond as their home ground, South Melbourne now shared Princes Park with Carlton as their home ground, and St. Kilda now played their home games at Toorak Park (this was possible because there was no VFA competition in 1943). Footscray, however, were able to return to the Western Oval as it was vacated by the defence authorities after a year.

Once the 16 round home-and-away season had finished, the 1943 VFL Premiers were determined by the specific format and conventions of the Page–McIntyre system.

Round 1

|- bgcolor="#CCCCFF"
| Home team
| Home team score
| Away team
| Away team score
| Venue
| Crowd
| Date
|- bgcolor="#FFFFFF"
| 
| 18.9 (117)
| 
| 13.14 (92)
| Windy Hill
| 16,000
| 8 May 1943
|- bgcolor="#FFFFFF"
| 
| 6.22 (58)
| 
| 7.12 (54)
| Victoria Park
| 8,000
| 8 May 1943
|- bgcolor="#FFFFFF"
| 
| 17.13 (115)
| 
| 8.23 (71)
| Princes Park
| 17,000
| 8 May 1943
|- bgcolor="#FFFFFF"
| 
| 14.9 (93)
| 
| 13.17 (95)
| Toorak Park
| 6,000
| 8 May 1943
|- bgcolor="#FFFFFF"
| 
| 14.12 (96)
| 
| 15.9 (99)
| Punt Road Oval
| 9,000
| 8 May 1943

Round 2

|- bgcolor="#CCCCFF"
| Home team
| Home team score
| Away team
| Away team score
| Venue
| Crowd
| Date
|- bgcolor="#FFFFFF"
| 
| 8.14 (62)
| 
| 8.14 (62)
| Arden Street Oval
| 5,000
| 15 May 1943
|- bgcolor="#FFFFFF"
| 
| 12.14 (86)
| 
| 15.19 (109)
| Princes Park
| 6,000
| 15 May 1943
|- bgcolor="#FFFFFF"
| 
| 7.8 (50)
| 
| 11.15 (81)
| Glenferrie Oval
| 7,000
| 15 May 1943
|- bgcolor="#FFFFFF"
| 
| 13.7 (85)
| 
| 9.12 (66)
| Punt Road Oval
| 16,000
| 15 May 1943
|- bgcolor="#FFFFFF"
| 
| 6.10 (46)
| 
| 8.18 (66)
| Western Oval
| 11,000
| 15 May 1943

Round 3

|- bgcolor="#CCCCFF"
| Home team
| Home team score
| Away team
| Away team score
| Venue
| Crowd
| Date
|- bgcolor="#FFFFFF"
| 
| 16.17 (113)
| 
| 16.16 (112)
| Brunswick Street Oval
| 15,500
| 22 May 1943
|- bgcolor="#FFFFFF"
| 
| 11.12 (78)
| 
| 9.11 (65)
| Windy Hill
| 9,000
| 22 May 1943
|- bgcolor="#FFFFFF"
| 
| 11.14 (80)
| 
| 12.16 (88)
| Victoria Park
| 10,000
| 22 May 1943
|- bgcolor="#FFFFFF"
| 
| 8.15 (63)
| 
| 17.12 (114)
| Toorak Park
| 11,000
| 22 May 1943
|- bgcolor="#FFFFFF"
| 
| 10.12 (72)
| 
| 17.15 (117)
| Punt Road Oval
| 5,000
| 22 May 1943

Round 4

|- bgcolor="#CCCCFF"
| Home team
| Home team score
| Away team
| Away team score
| Venue
| Crowd
| Date
|- bgcolor="#FFFFFF"
| 
| 13.11 (89)
| 
| 6.12 (48)
| Western Oval
| 7,000
| 29 May 1943
|- bgcolor="#FFFFFF"
| 
| 12.5 (77)
| 
| 15.14 (104)
| Princes Park
| 15,000
| 29 May 1943
|- bgcolor="#FFFFFF"
| 
| 15.14 (104)
| 
| 10.11 (71)
| Arden Street Oval
| 5,000
| 29 May 1943
|- bgcolor="#FFFFFF"
| 
| 13.8 (86)
| 
| 9.21 (75)
| Glenferrie Oval
| 9,000
| 29 May 1943
|- bgcolor="#FFFFFF"
| 
| 11.18 (84)
| 
| 14.13 (97)
| Punt Road Oval
| 23,000
| 29 May 1943

Round 5

|- bgcolor="#CCCCFF"
| Home team
| Home team score
| Away team
| Away team score
| Venue
| Crowd
| Date
|- bgcolor="#FFFFFF"
| 
| 17.11 (113)
| 
| 21.15 (141)
| Punt Road Oval
| 13,000
| 5 June 1943
|- bgcolor="#FFFFFF"
| 
| 23.12 (150)
| 
| 10.13 (73)
| Brunswick Street Oval
| 12,000
| 5 June 1943
|- bgcolor="#FFFFFF"
| 
| 16.10 (106)
| 
| 16.18 (114)
| Windy Hill
| 18,000
| 5 June 1943
|- bgcolor="#FFFFFF"
| 
| 10.15 (75)
| 
| 12.13 (85)
| Princes Park
| 14,000
| 5 June 1943
|- bgcolor="#FFFFFF"
| 
| 13.14 (92)
| 
| 12.8 (80)
| Toorak Park
| 9,000
| 5 June 1943

Round 6

|- bgcolor="#CCCCFF"
| Home team
| Home team score
| Away team
| Away team score
| Venue
| Crowd
| Date
|- bgcolor="#FFFFFF"
| 
| 14.7 (91)
| 
| 12.18 (90)
| Arden Street Oval
| 7,000
| 12 June 1943
|- bgcolor="#FFFFFF"
| 
| 21.17 (143)
| 
| 8.15 (63)
| Western Oval
| 8,000
| 12 June 1943
|- bgcolor="#FFFFFF"
| 
| 11.21 (87)
| 
| 5.12 (42)
| Victoria Park
| 7,000
| 12 June 1943
|- bgcolor="#FFFFFF"
| 
| 9.22 (76)
| 
| 11.16 (82)
| Princes Park
| 17,000
| 12 June 1943
|- bgcolor="#FFFFFF"
| 
| 12.17 (89)
| 
| 14.11 (95)
| Punt Road Oval
| 19,000
| 12 June 1943

Round 7

|- bgcolor="#CCCCFF"
| Home team
| Home team score
| Away team
| Away team score
| Venue
| Crowd
| Date
|- bgcolor="#FFFFFF"
| 
| 20.16 (136)
| 
| 13.17 (95)
| Glenferrie Oval
| 8,000
| 19 June 1943
|- bgcolor="#FFFFFF"
| 
| 16.11 (107)
| 
| 11.7 (73)
| Brunswick Street Oval
| 18,000
| 19 June 1943
|- bgcolor="#FFFFFF"
| 
| 12.12 (84)
| 
| 17.12 (114)
| Princes Park
| 11,000
| 19 June 1943
|- bgcolor="#FFFFFF"
| 
| 15.13 (103)
| 
| 8.14 (62)
| Windy Hill
| 11,000
| 19 June 1943
|- bgcolor="#FFFFFF"
| 
| 13.14 (92)
| 
| 11.21 (87)
| Punt Road Oval
| 8,000
| 19 June 1943

Round 8

|- bgcolor="#CCCCFF"
| Home team
| Home team score
| Away team
| Away team score
| Venue
| Crowd
| Date
|- bgcolor="#FFFFFF"
| 
| 10.11 (71)
| 
| 6.14 (50)
| Western Oval
| 7,500
| 26 June 1943
|- bgcolor="#FFFFFF"
| 
| 10.21 (81)
| 
| 13.9 (87)
| Victoria Park
| 5,000
| 26 June 1943
|- bgcolor="#FFFFFF"
| 
| 15.16 (106)
| 
| 9.13 (67)
| Princes Park
| 12,000
| 26 June 1943
|- bgcolor="#FFFFFF"
| 
| 15.16 (106)
| 
| 8.14 (62)
| Punt Road Oval
| 16,000
| 26 June 1943
|- bgcolor="#FFFFFF"
| 
| 15.8 (98)
| 
| 20.19 (139)
| Toorak Park
| 6,000
| 26 June 1943

Round 9

|- bgcolor="#CCCCFF"
| Home team
| Home team score
| Away team
| Away team score
| Venue
| Crowd
| Date

|- bgcolor="#FFFFFF"
| 
| 9.2 (56)
| 
| 13.7 (85)
| Arden Street Oval
| 10,000
| 3 July 1943
|- bgcolor="#FFFFFF"
| 
| 16.14 (110)
| 
| 12.10 (82)
| Punt Road Oval
| 8,000
| 3 July 1943
|- bgcolor="#FFFFFF"
| 
| 13.11 (89)
| 
| 11.13 (79)
| Glenferrie Oval
| 16,000
| 3 July 1943
|- bgcolor="#FFFFFF"
| 
| 15.18 (108)
| 
| 9.11 (65)
| Brunswick Street Oval
| 14,000
| 3 July 1943
|- bgcolor="#FFFFFF"
| 
| 10.13 (73)
| 
| 15.13 (103)
| Princes Park
| 13,000
| 3 July 1943

Round 10

|- bgcolor="#CCCCFF"
| Home team
| Home team score
| Away team
| Away team score
| Venue
| Crowd
| Date
|- bgcolor="#FFFFFF"
| 
| 9.23 (77)
| 
| 12.14 (86)
| Western Oval
| 8,000
| 10 July 1943
|- bgcolor="#FFFFFF"
| 
| 9.16 (70)
| 
| 13.7 (85)
| Windy Hill
| 8,000
| 10 July 1943
|- bgcolor="#FFFFFF"
| 
| 9.6 (60)
| 
| 16.14 (110)
| Victoria Park
| 8,000
| 10 July 1943
|- bgcolor="#FFFFFF"
| 
| 16.9 (105)
| 
| 11.14 (80)
| Princes Park
| 12,000
| 10 July 1943
|- bgcolor="#FFFFFF"
| 
| 10.11 (71)
| 
| 14.14 (98)
| Toorak Park
| 6,000
| 10 July 1943

Round 11

|- bgcolor="#CCCCFF"
| Home team
| Home team score
| Away team
| Away team score
| Venue
| Crowd
| Date
|- bgcolor="#FFFFFF"
| 
| 16.19 (115)
| 
| 11.14 (80)
| Princes Park
| 6,000
| 17 July 1943
|- bgcolor="#FFFFFF"
| 
| 10.19 (79)
| 
| 8.9 (57)
| Punt Road Oval
| 13,000
| 17 July 1943
|- bgcolor="#FFFFFF"
| 
| 7.14 (56)
| 
| 9.24 (78)
| Brunswick Street Oval
| 14,000
| 17 July 1943
|- bgcolor="#FFFFFF"
| 
| 16.14 (110)
| 
| 12.13 (85)
| Glenferrie Oval
| 8,000
| 17 July 1943
|- bgcolor="#FFFFFF"
| 
| 12.10 (82)
| 
| 11.12 (78)
| Arden Street Oval
| 7,000
| 17 July 1943

Round 12

|- bgcolor="#CCCCFF"
| Home team
| Home team score
| Away team
| Away team score
| Venue
| Crowd
| Date
|- bgcolor="#FFFFFF"
| 
| 10.10 (70)
| 
| 7.17 (59)
| Brunswick Street Oval
| 12,000
| 31 July 1943
|- bgcolor="#FFFFFF"
| 
| 14.11 (95)
| 
| 6.6 (42)
| Princes Park
| 8,000
| 31 July 1943
|- bgcolor="#FFFFFF"
| 
| 23.16 (154)
| 
| 11.8 (74)
| Punt Road Oval
| 8,000
| 31 July 1943
|- bgcolor="#FFFFFF"
| 
| 7.13 (55)
| 
| 9.12 (66)
| Glenferrie Oval
| 12,000
| 31 July 1943
|- bgcolor="#FFFFFF"
| 
| 11.8 (74)
| 
| 28.10 (178)
| Victoria Park
| 8,500
| 31 July 1943

Round 13

|- bgcolor="#CCCCFF"
| Home team
| Home team score
| Away team
| Away team score
| Venue
| Crowd
| Date
|- bgcolor="#FFFFFF"
| 
| 9.6 (60)
| 
| 21.13 (139)
| Punt Road Oval
| 14,000
| 7 August 1943
|- bgcolor="#FFFFFF"
| 
| 7.17 (59)
| 
| 19.19 (133)
| Western Oval
| 9,000
| 7 August 1943
|- bgcolor="#FFFFFF"
| 
| 11.24 (90)
| 
| 8.8 (56)
| Windy Hill
| 14,000
| 7 August 1943
|- bgcolor="#FFFFFF"
| 
| 14.24 (108)
| 
| 7.8 (50)
| Victoria Park
| 5,250
| 7 August 1943
|- bgcolor="#FFFFFF"
| 
| 13.19 (97)
| 
| 10.15 (75)
| Princes Park
| 15,000
| 7 August 1943

Round 14

|- bgcolor="#CCCCFF"
| Home team
| Home team score
| Away team
| Away team score
| Venue
| Crowd
| Date
|- bgcolor="#FFFFFF"
| 
| 15.14 (104)
| 
| 7.12 (54)
| Brunswick Street Oval
| 8,000
| 14 August 1943
|- bgcolor="#FFFFFF"
| 
| 9.14 (68)
| 
| 11.7 (73)
| Punt Road Oval
| 15,000
| 14 August 1943
|- bgcolor="#FFFFFF"
| 
| 7.11 (53)
| 
| 9.10 (64)
| Arden Street Oval
| 4,000
| 14 August 1943
|- bgcolor="#FFFFFF"
| 
| 12.18 (90)
| 
| 11.7 (73)
| Princes Park
| 6,000
| 14 August 1943
|- bgcolor="#FFFFFF"
| 
| 9.13 (67)
| 
| 10.10 (70)
| Windy Hill
| 19,000
| 14 August 1943

Round 15

|- bgcolor="#CCCCFF"
| Home team
| Home team score
| Away team
| Away team score
| Venue
| Crowd
| Date
|- bgcolor="#FFFFFF"
| 
| 13.10 (88)
| 
| 7.14 (56)
| Glenferrie Oval
| 15,000
| 21 August 1943
|- bgcolor="#FFFFFF"
| 
| 16.17 (113)
| 
| 9.9 (63)
| Victoria Park
| 6,500
| 21 August 1943
|- bgcolor="#FFFFFF"
| 
| 15.23 (113)
| 
| 7.5 (47)
| Princes Park
| 8,000
| 21 August 1943
|- bgcolor="#FFFFFF"
| 
| 15.19 (109)
| 
| 12.13 (85)
| Punt Road Oval
| 9,000
| 21 August 1943
|- bgcolor="#FFFFFF"
| 
| 9.10 (64)
| 
| 6.15 (51)
| Western Oval
| 6,000
| 21 August 1943

Round 16

|- bgcolor="#CCCCFF"
| Home team
| Home team score
| Away team
| Away team score
| Venue
| Crowd
| Date
|- bgcolor="#FFFFFF"
| 
| 10.11 (71)
| 
| 14.14 (98)
| Windy Hill
| 16,000
| 28 August 1943
|- bgcolor="#FFFFFF"
| 
| 8.11 (59)
| 
| 7.16 (58)
| Arden Street Oval
| 4,500
| 28 August 1943
|- bgcolor="#FFFFFF"
| 
| 10.19 (79)
| 
| 10.6 (66)
| Princes Park
| 4,000
| 28 August 1943
|- bgcolor="#FFFFFF"
| 
| 16.17 (113)
| 
| 14.17 (101)
| Punt Road Oval
| 5,000
| 28 August 1943
|- bgcolor="#FFFFFF"
| 
| 12.12 (84)
| 
| 10.9 (69)
| Brunswick Street Oval
| 18,000
| 28 August 1943

Ladder

Finals

Semi finals

|- bgcolor="#CCCCFF"
| Home team
| Score
| Away team
| Score
| Venue
| Crowd
| Date
|- bgcolor="#FFFFFF"
| 
| 13.16 (94)
| 
| 5.13 (43)
| Princes Park
| 39,874
| 4 September
|- bgcolor="#FFFFFF"
| 
| 9.17 (71)
| 
| 13.16 (94)
| Princes Park
| 24,100
| 11 September

Preliminary Final

|- bgcolor="#CCCCFF"
| Home team
| Score
| Away team
| Score
| Venue
| Crowd
| Date
|- bgcolor="#FFFFFF"
| 
| 12.14 (86)
| 
| 8.13 (61)
| Princes Park
| 27,335
| 18 September

Grand final

Richmond defeated Essendon 12.14 (86) to 11.15 (81), in front of a crowd of 42,100 (approx.) people. (For an explanation of scoring see Australian rules football).

Awards
 The 1943 VFL Premiership team was Richmond.
 The VFL's leading goalkicker was Fred Fanning of Melbourne with 62 goals.
 No Brownlow Medal was awarded in 1943.
 St Kilda took the "wooden spoon" in 1943.
St Kilda 11.14 (80) defeated  8.6 (54) in the Grand Final, played as a stand-alone match on 18 September at Victoria Park.

Notable events
 Hawthorn's coach Roy Cazaly renames the club "The Hawks" from "The Mayblooms". This season would be the closest Hawthorn would come to a finals appearance in their first 32 seasons (1925–56) in the VFL, finishing one spot outside the final four only by an inferior percentage to Carlton.
 In the spiteful Round 1 match between Essendon and South Melbourne, a vicious brawl broke out in the last quarter when South Melbourne's Jack "Basher" Williams felled Ted Leehane (apparently in a square-off retribution for Leehane's similar action against Williams in the 1942 Preliminary Final) which involved a dozen players, team officials, trainers, fans, and police. Three players were reported: Williams received an eight-week suspension for striking Leehane, Dick Reynolds, Gordon Lane, and Perc Bushby, 1940 Brownlow Medal winner Herbie Matthews was suspended for four weeks for striking Allan Hird, and Bushby was suspended for two weeks for striking Williams in retaliation.
 Entering Round 11, St Kilda and South Melbourne were tenth and eleventh on the ladder with two premiership points separating them; as such, the match between those two clubs in Round 11 directly decided which club was eliminated after the first set of home-and-away matches. South Melbourne won the game by 35 points.
 The VFL suspended its Round 12 matches and conducted a one-day lightning carnival amongst the top four teams; the Victorian Football League Patriotic Match Cup was won by Essendon.
 In Round 5, Denis Cordner makes his debut for Melbourne in a team that also contained his brothers Don and Ted.
 Munitions worker Bob Chitty plays for Carlton in Round 15 despite losing the top of his finger during the week in a workplace accident.
 Richmond's centre half-forward Jack Broadstock went Absent Without Leave (AWL) from his Army duties in order to play in the 1943 Grand Final. He was arrested by the Military Police upon his arrival at Princes Park, and it was only after some very persuasive talking by Richmond captain Jack Dyer, who was himself a policeman with the Victorian Police Force, that Broadstock's commanding officer dropped the matter and allowed him to play in the match. Broadstock went on to kick a goal and be one of Richmond's best players.
 For the first time, no score of four or fewer goals was kicked in a VFL season. The only seasons since without a goal tally of four or fewer have been 1969, 1973, 1982, 1983, 2005 and 2008.

References

 Hogan, P., The Tigers of Old, The Richmond Football Club, (Richmond), 1996. 
 Maplestone, M., Flying Higher: History of the Essendon Football Club 1872–1996, Essendon Football Club, (Melbourne), 1996. 
 Rogers, S. & Brown, A., Every Game Ever Played: VFL/AFL Results 1897–1997 (Sixth Edition), Viking Books, (Ringwood), 1998. 
 Ross, J. (ed), 100 Years of Australian Football 1897–1996: The Complete Story of the AFL, All the Big Stories, All the Great Pictures, All the Champions, Every AFL Season Reported, Viking, (Ringwood), 1996.

External links
 1943 Season - AFL Tables

Australian Football League seasons
Vfl season